Airport High School may refer to:
Airport High School (Michigan)
Airport High School (South Carolina)